Truro station may refer to:

Truro railway station, in Truro, Cornwall, England.
Truro railway station, South Australia, a former station in Truro, South Australia, Australia
Truro station (Massachusetts), a former station in Truro, Massachusetts, United States
North Truro station, a former station in North Truro, Massachusetts, United States
South Truro station, a former station in Truro, Massachusetts, United States
Truro station (Nova Scotia), in Truro, Nova Scotia, Canada

See also
Truro (disambiguation)